Kim Walker or Kimberly Walker may refer to:

 Kim Walker (actress) (1968–2001), American actress
 Kim Walker (bassoonist) (active 2000-present), Scottish-American musician
 Kim Walker (dancer), former dancer, CEO of NAISDA Dance College, Australia, since 2007/8 
 Kim Walker (field hockey) (born 1975), Australian field hockey player
 Kim Walker-Smith (born 1981), American singer, songwriter, Christian worship leader
 Kimberly Walker (soldier) (died 2013), American soldier and murder victim
 Paigion, stage name of Kimberly Paigion Walker (born 1986), American television personality and actress